Dale Schofield (April 14, 1915 – December 9, 2006) was an American hurdler. He competed in the men's 400 metres hurdles at the 1936 Summer Olympics.

References

1915 births
2006 deaths
Athletes (track and field) at the 1936 Summer Olympics
American male hurdlers
Olympic track and field athletes of the United States
Place of birth missing